Sydney Herbert Wilson  (1886 – November 1971) was a Fijian planter and politician. He served as a member of the Legislative Council between 1947 and 1950.

Biography
Born in Levuka, Wilson was a planter in the Savusavu area, where he had two plantations named Naseva and Oneva. He became president of the local Planter's club, and was elected chairman of the Union of Copra Producers in 1947.

Later in the same year he was appointed to the Legislative Council as one of the two European nominated members, serving until 1950.

Wilson was made an MBE in the 1951 Birthday Honours. He died in Savusavu in November 1971 at the age of 85.

References

1886 births
People from Levuka
Fijian farmers
Members of the Legislative Council of Fiji
Members of the Order of the British Empire
1971 deaths